The Fátima prayers are a collection of seven Catholic prayers associated with the 1917 Marian apparitions at Fátima, Portugal. Of the seven prayers, reportedly, the first two were taught to the three child visionaries by the Angel of Peace, the next three were taught to the children by Our Lady of Fátima herself during the course of the apparitions, and the final two were taught to Lúcia dos Santos, the eldest and last survivor of the three, in 1931 by Jesus when she was already a nun. Of the seven prayers, the Rosary Decade Prayer is the best-known and the most widely recited. For each prayer below, an English translation is given alongside the Portuguese original.

Angel of Peace

Theological Prayer

In the Spring of 1916, the Angel of Peace taught the three children of Fátima this prayer, making them repeat it three times.

The Angel then said, "Pray thus. The Hearts of Jesus and Mary are attentive to the voice of your supplications." To believe, adore, hope, and love God is to practice the theological virtues of faith, hope and charity.

Trinitarian Prayer

In August 1916, the Angel appeared and taught the children this prayer, again making them repeat it three times.

Sacrilege against the Eucharist includes receiving it in a state of mortal sin.

Our Lady of Fátima

Trinitarian Prayer

During the initial apparition on May 13, 1917, Our Lady bathed the children in light, and they were "moved by an interior impulse that was ... communicated to [them]", so they said this prayer.

It is the Trinity, present in the person of Christ, who is in the Eucharist.

Offering Prayer

On June 13, 1917, Our Lady said to the children "Sacrifice yourselves for sinners, and say [this prayer] many times, especially whenever you make some sacrifice[.]"

Rosary Decade Prayer

As the most well-known of the prayers, this is often referred to simply as the "Fátima Prayer". On that same day (June 13, 1917), Our Lady taught the children to say this prayer after each decade of the Rosary. She also encouraged the children to continue daily recitation of the Rosary.

Tuy Chapel
These prayers were reportedly taught privately by Jesus to Sister Lucia in 1931 when she was a nun in the Galician town of Tuy, across the border with Spain. These alleged revelations of Christ have not been approved by the Church; only the angelic and Marian apparitions of 1916 and 1917 are approved.

Conversion Prayer

Salvation Prayer

See also

 Our Lady of Fátima
 Catholic devotions

Notes

References

External links
 "Fatima in Sister Lucia's own words" – Free online version of the memoir book written by Sister Lucia, O.C.D.
 "The True Story of Fatima" – Free online version of the book written by Father John de Marchi, I.M.C.
 "Sister Lucia: Apostle of Mary's Immaculate Heart" – Free online version of the book written by Mark Fellows

Roman Catholic prayers
Our Lady of Fátima